The Goreng Goreng, also known Kooreng Gooreng, are an inland Freshwater Australian Aboriginal people of Queensland, and also a language group. The Goreng Goreng area is between Central West Queensland in the north around Boyne Valley, extending westerly as far as the Great Dividing Range along the Dawes, Auburn, Nogo and Callide Ranges to meet the Wulli Wulli and Ghunghulu to their immediate west over the Great Dividing Range.

Language
Gurang Gurang is member of the Waka-Kabic subgroup of the Pama–Nyungan languages. The word gurang means "nought", and, replicated, was used as a marker for the people. Despite the tribe's relative proximity to Rockhampton, Gureng gureng language had strong affinities to languages to its south such as Wakka Wakka and Gubbi Gubbi, an affinity that was also cultural.

Country

The precise borders of traditional Gooreng Gooreng lands have been disputed. Walter Roth, while collecting data on their language in the later 19th century, placed them in Camboon Rawbelle where their main camp was at that time, Jiggings". It is possible that a confusion arose, taking two distinct dialect forms of the one cultural complex, to denote distinct and separate realities, with the Gureng Gureng taken to be an inland tribe, and the Goeng (Meerooni) denoting their affines on the coast. A recent survey of the available evidence concludes that the Goreng goring's lands encompassed the "whole of Boyne Valley to Auburn NoGo Callide Cania Ranges No Coastal Reef Dialect Language exists as Kooreng Gooreng Gooreng Gooreng are inland Freshwater People
Their Totem is the Emu

Society and culture
The Gureng gureng were divided into several clans, such as the Wakgun. Traditional lore was transmitted at a djaparlagin or a "singing corroboree".

History of contact
The Upper Burnett area first began to be settled by colonists in the 1840s. Grazing land was not available further down the river for some decades. Hostilities broke out as land seized for grazing denied aboriginals access to their food resources, and clashes were frequent, leading to several massacres in the Miriam Vale area. It is estimated that between 1847 and 1853, 28 squatters and shepherds were killed as the Burdekin people resisted the onset of the occupation. On each occasion, punitive raids were undertaken to punish the tribes, causing substantial loss of life among the latter. The severity of retaliation was sufficiently drastic to lead the Colonial Office to place the Burnett area's Aboriginal people under official protection by the Native Mounted Police.

See also
 List of Indigenous Australian group names

Notes

Citations

Sources

Aboriginal peoples of Queensland